The Engie Open de Seine-et-Marne is a tournament for professional female tennis players played on indoor hard courts. The event is classified as a $60,000 ITF Women's Circuit tournament and has been held in Croissy-Beaubourg, France, since 2013.

Past finals

Singles

Doubles

External links 
  

ITF Women's World Tennis Tour
Hard court tennis tournaments
Tennis tournaments in France
Recurring sporting events established in 2013